Galaro is a settlement on the island of Zakynthos, Greece.

Populated places in Zakynthos